Kongsvinger is a municipality in Innlandet county, Norway. It is located in the traditional district of Glåmdal. The administrative centre of the municipality is the town of Kongsvinger. Other settlements in the municipality include Austmarka, Brandval, Lundersæter, and Roverud.

The  municipality is the 111th largest by area out of the 356 municipalities in Norway. Kongsvinger is the 72nd most populous municipality in Norway with a population of 17,949.

General information
In 1854, the King designated the market town of Kongsvinger as a kjøpstad, which gave it special rights. Because of this designation, on 7 February 1855, the town was separated from the municipality of Vinger to form a separate municipality. Initially, the town had 472 residents and this left Vinger municipality with 10,947 residents. On 1 January 1876, the town was enlarged when an area of Vinger (population: 209) was transferred into Kongsvinger. During the 1960s, there were many municipal mergers across Norway due to the work of the Schei Committee. On 1 January 1964, the town of Kongsvinger (population: 2,345) and the surrounding municipalities of Vinger (population: 6,257) and Brandval (population: 4,384) were merged to form the new Kongsvinger Municipality. The new municipality of Kongsvinger (briefly) lost its status as an urban municipality after this amalgamation due to merging with rural municipalities. One year later, on 1 January 1965, the government redesignated Kongsvinger as an urban municipality. On 1 January 1974, the unpopulated Lystad area was transferred from Grue Municipality to Kongsvinger Municipality. On 1 January 1986, the northern part of the Åbogen area (population: 14) was transferred from Kongsvinger to the neighboring municipality of Eidskog.

Name
The whole region where Kongsvinger is located was historically called Vinger. This name could be related to the river Glomma which flows through the region. One could compare this to the English word swing (for the missing s see Indo-European s-mobile). The river Glomma passes through the center of the district where the south-flowing river takes a sharp northwestward turn. This can be compared to the similar Lithuanian word vìngis which means "bend", "bow", or "turn". This old name used to represent this whole area. The first element of the name Kongs- (meaning "the King's") was added after the Kongsvinger Fortress was built in 1690. Then, it was later given to the town that grew up around it.

Coat of arms
The coat of arms was granted on 25 June 1926. The arms show the Kongsvinger Fortress in gray on a black hill with a red background. Below the fortress is a white line representing the Glomma river. The fortress is of historical importance to the area. The red and white colors were chosen because they are on the Norwegian flag.

Churches
The Church of Norway has three parishes within the municipality of Kongsvinger. It is part of the Solør, Vinger og Odal prosti (deanery) in the Diocese of Hamar.

History
The area was historically a part of the prestegjeld of Vinger. The village that later became Kongsvinger already existed as a trading center by the Middle Ages, due to the accessibility by natural waterways. Viking chieftains reached Sweden by boat from Kongsvinger. Kongsvinger Fortress was founded in 1669, and a star-shaped plan was laid out for the fortress. Work began in 1682 and it was finished in 1690 as part of a general upgrade to Norwegian fortresses. The building of the fortress formed the foundations for what was to become the town of Kongsvinger. The fortress was built as a defensive structure against the Swedes, and on numerous occasions there have been military engagements in the area around the fortress, but Kongsvinger fortress has never been taken in military combat. Below Kongsvinger fortress lies Øvrebyen, which literally translated means "upper town". This is the oldest part of the town of Kongsvinger, and one can still find a number of the original houses built after the establishment of the fortress. Kongsvinger Museum is located here, together with a museum of female emancipation in a building called "Rolighed", the home of Dagny Juel, the famous author once portrayed by Edvard Munch.

The rural, eastern parts of Kongsvinger and its neighboring municipalities to the north and south were populated at the end of the 17th century by Finnish emigrants who came across the Swedish border. The area is called Finnskogen which means "The Finnish forest".

Kongsvinger played an important part in the Norwegian resistance force against the Nazis being a gateway to Sweden. Norway's highest decorated citizen, Gunnar Sønsteby frequently passed through Kongsvinger in his work to sabotage the Nazis' installations in Norway. Some of the busiest escape routes for refugees also went through Kongsvinger to Sweden.

From 1983 to 1999, and again in 2010, Kongsvinger's association football team KIL Toppfotball held a position in the Norwegian Premier League. It made some notable merits participating in the UEFA Cup and winning a silver medal during the 1992 season.

Government
All municipalities in Norway, including Kongsvinger, are responsible for primary education (through 10th grade), outpatient health services, senior citizen services, unemployment and other social services, zoning, economic development, and municipal roads. The municipality is governed by a municipal council of elected representatives, which in turn elects a mayor.  The municipality falls under the Romerike og Glåmdal District Court and the Eidsivating Court of Appeal.

Municipal council
The municipal council  of Kongsvinger is made up of 33 representatives that are elected to four year terms. The party breakdown of the council is as follows:

Geography
Kongsvinger is situated on both sides of the river Glomma, where the south-flowing river takes a sharp northwestward turn. The Kongsvinger Fortress is the main landmark, situated on a hill west and north of the river. Kongsvinger is a regional center of the Glåmdal region, which is made up of the southern parts of Innlandet county. Kongsvinger municipality is bordered to the west by the municipality of Sør-Odal, to the north by Grue, and to the south by Eidskog. To the east it borders Eda and Torsby municipalities in Sweden.

Transportation

Travel to and from Kongsvinger:
 Several daily train services to Oslo
 Twice daily train services to Stockholm, Sweden
 Five daily train services to Karlstad, Sweden
 Several daily bus services to Elverum, Hamar, and Charlottenberg, Sweden
 Suburban bus services running throughout the town of Kongsvinger
 Four lane highway between Kongsvinger and Oslo is under construction.

Distances
The following are road distances to Kongsvinger from various locations:

Economy
There are 1,530 businesses including forestry and farming, and 245 of these are retail outlets. As well as downtown shopping streets, there are also glass domed pedestrian shopping streets. The governmental regional Kongsvinger Hospital is also situated in Kongsvinger.

Major businesses

Education

Notable residents

Public service & public thinking 

 Christen Schmidt (1727 in Kongsvinger – 1804) Bishop of the Diocese of Oslo from 1773
 Georg Ræder (1814 in Kongsvinger – 1898) a military officer, railway pioneer and politician
 Hans Georg Jacob Stang (1830–1907) a Norwegian attorney and Norway's Prime Minister, 1888–1889; established his legal practice in Kongsvinger in 1859
 Anna Stang (1834–1901) a feminist, liberal politician, president of the Norwegian Association for Women's Rights, wife of Jacob Stang, ran a private school in Kongsvinger for 17 years
 Carl Wille Schnitler (1879 in Brandval – 1926) a Norwegian art historian
 Rudolf Falck Ræder (1881 in Kongsvinger – 1951) a military officer, engineer and politician 
 Åse Wisløff Nilssen (born 1945 in Kongsvinger) a Norwegian politician
 Tove Strand (born 1946 in Kongsvinger) a Norwegian politician
 Monica Kristensen Solås (born 1950) a glaciologist, polar explorer and crime novelist; brought up in Kongsvinger
 Karin Andersen (born 1952) a Norwegian politician, serving as mp for the Socialist Left Party (SV).

The Arts 
 Maren Elisabeth Bang (1797 in Skansgården – 1884) wrote the first printed Norwegian cookbook
 Erika Nissen (1845 in Kongsvinger – 1903) a Norwegian pianist.
 Erik Werenskiold (1855 in Eidskog – 1938) a Norwegian painter and illustrator
 Dagny Juel (1867 in Kongsvinger – 1901) a Norwegian writer, famous for her liaisons with various prominent artists, and for the dramatic circumstances of her death
 Borghild Langaard (1883 in Kongsvinger – 1939) a Norwegian operatic soprano
 Eva Lund Haugen (1907 in Kongsvinger – 1996) an American author, editor and translator
 Pål Refsdal (born 1963 in Kongsvinger) a freelance journalist, photographer and filmmaker 
 Roy Lønhøiden (born 1964 in Kongsvinger) a country music composer and singer-songwriter
 Levi Henriksen (born 1964 in Kongsvinger) a novelist, short story writer and singer-songwriter
 Håvard Gimse (born 1966 in Kongsvinger) a Norwegian classical pianist
 Hildegunn Øiseth (1966 in Kongsvinger) jazz musician on trumpet, flugelhorn and bukkehorn
 Runar Søgaard (born 1967 in Kongsvinger) a leadership trainer, life-coach and motivational speaker
 Thomas Cappelen Malling (born 1970 in Kongsvinger) a Norwegian author and director 
 Andreas Ulvo (born 1983 in Kongsvinger) jazz pianist, organist, composer and photographer 
 Jóhanna Guðrún Jónsdóttir (born 1990) stage name Yohanna, Icelandic singer at the Eurovision Song Contest 2009, lives in Kongsvinger

Sport 

 Sverre Strandli (1925 in Brandval – 1985) a Norwegian hammer thrower, competed at the 1952 Summer Olympics
 Bjørge Stensbøl (born 1947 in Kongsvinger) former chief of top-level athletics Olympiatoppen
 Even Pellerud (born 1953 in Kongsvinger) former football player with 180 club caps and coach
 Øivind Tomteberget (born 1953 in Kongsvinger) a retired football midfielder, 660 games for Kongsvinger IL
 Espen Nystuen (born 1981 in Kongsvinger) a former footballer with over 300 club caps
 Lars Krogh Gerson (born 1990 in Luxembourg, Luxembourg, grew up in Kongsvinger) a footballer playing for Luxembourg. 
 Ole Christian Veiby (born 1996 in Kongsvinger) rally driver

International relations

Twin towns — sister cities
Kongsvinger has sister city agreements with the following places:
  Arvika, Värmland County, Sweden
  Ebel es Saqi, Marjayoun, Lebanon
  Skive, Denmark
  Ylöjärvi, Länsi-Suomi, Finland

In popular culture
Kongsvinger is referenced within the title (and indirectly within the lyrics) of the song "A Sentence Of Sorts In Kongsvinger" by the American rock band Of Montreal on the 2007 album Hissing Fauna, Are You the Destroyer?.

References

External links

Municipal fact sheet from Statistics Norway 
Byen vår (cultural organisation) 
Glåmdalen local newspaper 
Go Norway Norwegian Tourism - Kongsvinger 

 
Municipalities of Innlandet
1855 establishments in Norway